Ismihan Sultan ("Purity of the Khan" or "Highness of the Khan"; Manisa, 1545 – Costantinople, 8 August 1585) was an Ottoman princess, daughter of Selim II (reign 1566–74) and his legal wife, Nurbanu Sultan. She was the granddaughter of Suleiman the Magnificent (reign 1520–66) and his favourite consort and legal wife Hürrem Sultan, sister of Sultan Murad III (reign 1574–95) and aunt of Sultan Mehmed III (reign 1595–1603).

Life

Early years
Ismihan Sultan was born in Manisa in 1545. Her father was Şehzade Selim (future Selim II), son of Sultan Suleiman the Magnificent and Hurrem Sultan. She spent her early life in Manisa and Konya, where her father served as a sanjak-bey. Her mother was Nurbanu Sultan.

First marriage
In 1562, strong alliances were made for the daughters of Şehzade Selim, the prince who would succeed Suleiman as Selim II, on 17 August 1562 Ismihan married Sokollu Mehmed Pasha, Gevherhan the admiral Piyale Pasha, and Şah the chief falconer Hasan Agha. Her father was particularly happy to give Ismihan's hand to Sokollu as a reward for the vizier's help in his succession struggle with his brother Şehzade Bayezid. The State Treasury covered the expenses for the imperial wedding and granted 15,000 florins as a wedding gift to the imperial son-in-law. The couple owned two palaces, one located in Kadırga, and the other one located in Üsküdar. The two together had three sons and a daughter.

The Ragusans remarked on the marriage of Ismihan and Sokollu Mehmed Pasha, according to which he was awed by the sultana no less than others were by him. She frequently referred to him as “Vlach, in 
other words, a most vile rustic” (Murlacco, che vuol dire contadino vilissimo).

Second marriage
After the death of the grand vizier Sokollu Mehmed Pasha in 1579, the princess's first choice for a new husband was Ösdemiroğlu Osman Pasha. However, he was not interested. Her next choice was Kalaylıkoz Ali Pasha, the governor of Buda, who agreed to the marriage, but when the imperial order came demanding his divorce, his wife's sorrow and suffering were said to have caused the city to revolt. However, the two married in 1584 and had a son, Sultanzade Mahmud Bey born in 1585.

Court Career
In 1575, just after her brother Sultan Murad ascended to the throne, her daily stipend consisted of 300 aspers. In the early 1580s, Ismihan collaborated with her mother Nurbanu to further isolate Safiye Sultan politically. After which Murad accepted as a gift from her, two beautiful slave women, each skilled at dance and musical performance. The French refused to return two Turkish women who had been captured at sea by Henry III's brother-in-law and made members of Catherine de' Medici's court. Interceding on behalf of the Turkish women were Ismihan and her aunt, Mihrimah Sultan.

Issue
Only two of Ismihan's five children survived after infancy.

From her first marriage, Ismihan had three sons and a daughter:
Safiye Hanımsultan (1563 - ?): Ismihan Sultan's eldest child. She was firstly married to her father's cousin Sokollu Mustafa Pasha, governor of Buda. After his exection in 1578, she married new governor of Buda Silahdar Cafer Pasha. After his death in 1587, she bore him two posthumous twin sons Mehmed Bey and Cafer Bey, who died as children. She married thirdly to Sultanzade Abdülbaki Bey, son of her mother's cousin Hümaşah Sultan.
Sultanzade Ahmed Bey (1563 - 1567)
Sultanzade Sokolluzâde Ibrahim Han Paşah (1565 - 1621). In 1924, an his descendant Sokulluzade Abdülbâki Ihsân Bey married another Ottoman princess, Rukiye Sultan, granddaughter of Sultan Mehmed V. 
Sultanzade Piri Mehmed Bey (1566 - 1567)

From her second marriage, Ismihan had a son:
Sultanzade Mahmud Bey (5 August 1585 - 24 September 1585): Ismihan died giving birth to him. He died 50 days after his mother.

Death
Ismihan Sultan died in childbed on 8 August 1585 and was buried in the mausoleum of her father located in Hagia Sophia.  Her newborn son Mahmud would outlive her by no more than fifty days.

Charities
Ismihan commissioned a mosque located near the Hippodrome, bearing Sokollu Mehmed Pasha's name. Her husband was responsible for the religious college and dervish hostel associated with it. She also commissioned another mosque in her name in Mangalia, Romania. She also endowed a library in her own madrasa in Eyüp. Peasants on royal endowment land were accorded privileged treatment. The inhabitants of the Bulgarian village of Bobosevo, which had formed part of the holdings of Ismihan, today still remember that their village was under the protection of a princess (“under the veil of a Sultana”).

References

Sources
 
 
 
 
 

1545 births
1585 deaths
16th-century Ottoman princesses
Deaths in childbirth